= Erfan Khani =

Iranian footballer

Personal information
- Full name: Erfan Khani
- Date of birth: 15 August 1999 (age 27)
- Place of birth: Tehran, Iran
- Height: 1.80 m (5 ft 11 in)
- Position: Left-back

Team information
- Current team: Saipa
- Number: 24

Youth career
- 2012–2018: Saipa
- 2018–2019: Esperanza
- 2019–2020: Saipa

Senior career*
Years	Team	Apps	(Gls)
2020–	Saipa	0	(0)

International career^{‡}
- Iran U20
2017–2018	Iran U23		
- * Club domestic league appearances and goals as of 21 September 2021 ‡ National team caps and goals as of 21 September 2021

Erfan Khani (Persian: عرفان خانی; born 15 August 1999) is an Iranian professional footballer who plays as a left-back for Azadegan League club Saipa.
